Exercise in Tension is the debut studio album of Dessau, released in 1989 by Carlyle Records.

Music
The track "Europe Light" was originally released on the Happy Mood EP and was then provided to the 1989 Music View - Radio's Alternative Talk Show #59 & #60 compilation by Joseph Fox Communications, Inc. The song was also remixed and released as additional material on the compact disc version and the following year as a single with "Bejing" on August 3, 1990. The band's cover of Joy Division's "Isolation" was recorded in 1988 and produced by Paul Barker of Revolting Cocks and Al Jourgensen of Ministry. The cover has been released as a 12" single and on three various artists compilations: C'Est La Silenz Qui Fait La Musique... (1994, Electro Pulse), CDPRO Vol #13 (June 1996) (1996, EMI Music Canada) and Down & Dirty (1999, Pet Rock). "Isolation" and the track "Bejing", from the CD edition of the album, became a minor hits for the band.

Reception

AllMusic awarded Exercise in Tension a rating of three out of five stars.

Track listing

Personnel
Adapted from the Exercise in Tension liner notes.

Dessau
 John Elliott – instruments, vocals, production, mixing, cover art
 Barry Nelson – bass guitar, mixing, cover art
 Mike Orr – guitar, vocals, mixing, cover art

Production and design
 Paul Barker – production (B4)
 Bill Brunt – cover art
 Brian Hardin – editing ("Beijing")
 Al Jourgensen – production (B4)
 Mike Poole – engineering
 Giles Reaves – production, engineering, mixing
 Todd Sholar – engineering
 Steve Spapperi – engineering (B4)
 Preston Sullivan – executive-producer
 Rick Will – mixing and editing ("Beijing")

Release history

References

External links 
 

1989 debut albums
Dessau (band) albums
Albums produced by Paul Barker
Albums produced by Al Jourgensen
Albums produced by Giles Reaves